Steve Brignall (born 12 June 1960) is an English former footballer who played in the Football League for Arsenal.

References

External links
 
 Steve Brignall profile at Arsenal.com

English footballers
English Football League players
1960 births
Living people
Arsenal F.C. players
Hastings United F.C. players
Association football defenders